The Thunersee–Beatenberg Funicular (TBB) is a funicular in the Swiss Canton of Berne.

At Beatenbucht, the funicular connects with shipping services, run by BLS AG, and bus services, run by Verkehrsbetriebe STI. Both shipping and bus services connect Beatenbucht to Interlaken and Thun. At Beatenberg, the funicular connects with the Seilbahnen Beatenberg-Niederhorn, a gondola lift which runs to the summit of the Niederhorn.

History 
The funicular was built in 1888 and 1889, and opened on 21 June 1889, by the Drahtseilbahn Thunersee–Beatenberg company. The funicular was converted to electric operation in 1911, and the following year it commenced year round operation. The onward connection to the summit of the Niederhorn by cable car was first opened, by a separate company, in 1946.

The line was completely reconstructed between October 2004 and July 2005, and new modern style cars were provided. In 2014, the funicular and cable car companies were merged, to create the current Niederhornbahn AG company. In the autumn of 2016, a new motor and electronic control system was installed.

Operation 
The line comprises a single track of  gauge with a central passing loop. There is one intermediate stop, at Birchi.

The journey time is either 10 or 6 minutes, depending on the speed selected, with cars operating every 20 minutes or more frequently. The line has a theoretical maximum capacity of 700 people per hour.

The line is owned by the Niederhornbahn AG and managed by the Verkehrsbetriebe STI.

Further reading

See also 
 List of funicular railways
 List of funiculars in Switzerland

Gallery

References

External links 

Thunersee Beatenberg Bahn page from Funimag
Niederhornbahn AG web site

Beatenberg
Bernese Oberland
1200 mm gauge railways in Switzerland
Transport in the canton of Bern
Railway lines opened in 1889
Beatenberg